Herman Frasch Whiton (April 6, 1904 – September 6, 1967) was the son of Henry Devereux Whiton and Frieda Frasch. He was an American sailor and Olympic champion. He was born in Cleveland to Henry Devereux Whiton and Frieda Frasch, heiress to the Union Sulpher Company. He was also the grandson of inventor and entrepreneur Herman Frasch and died in New York City.  He was married to Emelyn Thatcher Whiton from 1939 to 1957. On Jan 15, 1958, Herman married Katherine M. O'Brien, 41 years of age.

He graduated from Princeton University.  After graduating he was a supporter of the university's Physics Department, and was instrumental in its acquisition of a Synchrotron.

He served as President and Chairman of the Board of the Union Sulphur Company until 1952.

He competed at the 1948 Summer Olympics in London, where he won a gold medal in the 6 metre class with the boat 'Llanoria'. At the 1952 Summer Olympics in Helsinki he won a gold medal with the same boat Llanoria, but with a different crew that included his wife Emelyn Whiton.

He also twice won the Scandinavian Gold Cup in the 6 metre class.

See also
 List of Princeton University Olympians

References

External links
 
 
 

1904 births
1967 deaths
American male sailors (sport)
Olympic gold medalists for the United States in sailing
Princeton Tigers sailors
Sailors at the 1928 Summer Olympics – 6 Metre
Sailors at the 1948 Summer Olympics – 6 Metre
Sailors at the 1952 Summer Olympics – 6 Metre
Medalists at the 1948 Summer Olympics
Medalists at the 1952 Summer Olympics